Barbara Ann Lekberg (née Barbara Ann Hult; March 19, 1925 – February 14, 2018) was an American sculptor.

Early life and education 
Barbara Lekberg was born as Barbara Ann Hult on March 19, 1925, in Portland, Oregon. Her mother was music teacher Mildred Anderson, and her father was in the family lumber business, Melvin Hult.

Lekberg attended University of Iowa, studying sculpture under , Philip Guston, and Mauricio Lasansky. She graduated in 1946 with a B.A. degree in sculpture, and in 1947 with a M.A. degree in art history. She moved to New York City in the late 1940s. Lekberg studied at The Clay Club (now known as the SculptureCenter), under Sahl Swarz and learned how to weld steel sculptures.

Career 
Her first solo exhibition was in 1959 at the SculptureCenter. She made large figurative metal sculptors, often involving draped fabrics. Lekberg taught classes at the University of the Arts, from 1981 to 2001.

She was a member of the National Academy of Design. Lekberg was awarded the Guggenheim Fellowship in fine arts two times (1957, 1959).

Personal life 
In 1956, she married Victor Tamerlis, a rare-books dealer and together they lived in Greenwich Village. They had a daughter born in 1962, Zoe Tamerlis Lund. The short film Zoe Rising (2014), documented their daughter's life through the memories of Barbara Lekberg.

Lekberg died on February 14, 2018, in a nursing home in the Bronx, after struggling with Alzheimer’s disease.

References 

1925 births
2018 deaths
University of Iowa alumni
Artists from Portland, Oregon
Artists from New York City
American women sculptors
Deaths from dementia in New York (state)
Deaths from Alzheimer's disease
21st-century American women artists